José Adalberto Castro Castro (born 19 October 1950) is a Mexican politician affiliated with the Institutional Revolutionary Party. As of 2014 he served as Senator of the LIX Legislature of the Mexican Congress representing Sinaloa as replacement of Lauro Díaz Castro, who died in office.

References

1950 births
Living people
People from Sinaloa
Members of the Senate of the Republic (Mexico)
Institutional Revolutionary Party politicians
21st-century Mexican politicians